Ellen is a female given name.

Ellen may also refer to:

Places
 Mount Ellen (Utah)
 Mount Ellen (Vermont), in the Green Mountains
 Lake Ellen (Minnesota)
 Lake Ellen (Wisconsin)
 Port Ellen, Argyll, Scotland
 River Ellen, Cumbria, England
 Ellen Glacier, Ellsworth Mountains, Antarctica
 Ellen Street, Fremantle, Western Australia
 2735 Ellen, an asteroid

People
 Ellen, a list of people with the name Ellen
 Ellen (surname), a list of people with surname Ellen

Ships
 , several United States Navy ships
 Ellen (1883) (or SS Ellen),  a ship wrecked in South Australia
 , a battery-powered ferryboat that operates in Denmark

Other uses
 Ellen (TV series) (1994–1998), a sitcom about a bookstore owner, starring Ellen DeGeneres
 The Ellen DeGeneres Show (2003–2022), a syndicated talk show 
 Ellen; or, The Fanatic's Daughter, an 1860 novel
 Tropical Storm Ellen (disambiguation), including a list of storms with the name

See also
 Elen (disambiguation)